Dom Angelo Grillo O.S.B. (1557–1629) was an Italian early baroque poet belonging to the noble Genoese family of the Spinola. He wrote mostly religious verse under his own name, but as Livio Celiano, his pseudonym, he wrote amorous madrigal texts.

Biography 
Born in 1557 to a wealthy Genovese family, Grillo took Benedictine orders as a teenager in 1572. Grillo's own religious poems began appearing in anthologies in 1585, and he published his first single-authored collection of Rime in 1589. A prolific writer, he published several other collections; in 1595 his Pietosi affetti, his masterwork, appeared for the first time. He reworked and expanded the collection, and it was published eleven times by its arrival at a final version, a corpus of more than two thousand poems, in 1629. He died that same year.

Impact and legacy 
Beginning in 1584, Grillo maintained an epistolary correspondence with Torquato Tasso, then imprisoned in Sant'Anna; Tasso dedicated several works to him, including the Discorso dell'arte del dialogo of 1585.

Grillo was one of the most highly regarded poets of his generation. Between 1587 and 1613, twenty editions of his poetry appeared, a record for a poet of that time. His letters were published in several editions after his death. Marino knew Grillo's poetry and utilized some of his religious themes. 

Much of his verse was especially designed for musical setting. His madrigal texts were set by Monteverdi, Filippo Bonaffino, Orazio Vecchi, Luca Marenzio, Giuliano Paratico, Salamone Rossi, Pomponio Nenna and others.

The close relationship between Grillo and Monteverdi appears in their correspondence, which began about 1610 and continued until the poet's death in 1629.

Grillo's letters to Giulio Caccini, to Caccini's daughters, Francesca and Settimia, who were both musicians, to Monteverdi, to the poets Rinuccini and Chiabrera, to Giovanni Matteo Bembo, throw most interesting and revealing sidelights on the relationships of poets and musicians.

Works 

 Rime morali (1580 and 1599);
 Affetti pietosi (1581);
 Pompe della Morte (1599);
 Elogio di Giovanni Imperiali di doge a Genova (1618).

Bibliography

References

External links 
 

1554 births
1629 deaths
Italian poets
Italian male poets
Italian-language poets
Italian Benedictines
Baroque writers